Solo is a musical album released in November 24, 2004 by Guatemalan singer-songwriter Ricardo Arjona. It was nominated for Best Latin Pop Album at the 46th Annual Grammy Awards.

Track listing 
 Te Conozco
 Desnuda
 Mujeres
 Lo Poco Que Queda de Mí
 Porque Es Tan Cruel El Amor
 Tu Reputación
 Asignatura Pendiente
 Olvidarte
 Soledad
 Si El Norte Fuera El Sur
 Realmente No Estoy Tan Solo
 Señora de Las Cuatro Décadas
 La Mujer Que No Soñé

Sales and certifications

References

External links 
 http://www.ricardoarjona.com/

2004 greatest hits albums
Ricardo Arjona compilation albums
Sony Music Argentina albums
Spanish-language compilation albums